The 2014 Oddset Hockey Games is played between 1–4 May 2014. The Czech Republic, Finland, Sweden and Russia play a round-robin for a total of three games per team and six games in total. Five of the matches are played in the Ericsson Globe in Stockholm, Sweden, and one match in the Hartwall Arena in Helsinki, Finland. Finland won the tournament for the fifth time. The tournament is a part of the 2013–14 Euro Hockey Tour.

Standings

Games
All times are local (UTC+2 for the games in Sweden, and UTC+3 for the game in Finland).

Awards and statistics

Best player awards

Best Goaltender:  Pekka Rinne
Best Defenceman:  Juuso Hietanen
Best Forward:  Oscar Möller

All-star team
Goaltender:  Pekka Rinne
Defence:  Anton Belov,  Juuso Hietanen
Forwards:  Petri Kontiola,  Oscar Möller,  Viktor Tikhonov
MVP:  Pekka Rinne

References

External links
Hockeyarchives 

2013–14 Euro Hockey Tour
2013–14 in Swedish ice hockey
2013–14 in Russian ice hockey
2013–14 in Finnish ice hockey
2013–14 in Czech ice hockey
Sweden Hockey Games
May 2014 sports events in Europe
2010s in Stockholm
International sports competitions in Helsinki
2010s in Helsinki
International sports competitions in Stockholm